Science fiction films
This is a list of science fiction films organized chronologically. These films have been released to a cinema audience by the commercial film industry and are widely distributed with reviews by reputable
critics. (The exception are the films on the made-for-TV list, which are normally not released to a cinema audience.) This includes silent film–era releases, serial films, and feature-length films. All of the films include core elements of science fiction, but can cross into other genres such as drama, mystery, action, horror, fantasy, and comedy.

Among the listed movies are films that have won motion-picture and science fiction awards as well as films that have been listed among the worst movies ever made, or have won one or more Golden Raspberry Awards. Critically distinguished films are indicated by footnotes in the listings.

Lists by decade

See also

Subgenre lists
List of comic science fiction films
List of science fiction horror films
List of science fiction thriller films
List of films featuring extraterrestrials
List of films set in the future
List of time travel films
List of films featuring space stations
 List of films featuring dinosaurs
List of films set in the future
List of space opera films
Related films
Fantasy films
Horror films
Superhero film

Related lists
List of science fiction television films
List of Sci Fi Pictures original films
List of science fiction anime
List of film serials
List of fantasy films
Lists of horror films
List of stories set in a future now past
List of fictional spacecraft
List of fictional space stations
Starship (interstellar spacecraft)#Fictional examples

Film ratings
Hugo Award for Best Dramatic Presentation
Hugo Award for Best Dramatic Presentation, Long Form
Saturn Award for Best Science Fiction Film
List of films considered the best
List of films considered the worst

References

External links
 Note: select a decade.

 
Science Fiction Films